The John Thompson House is a historic house near Richboro in Northampton Township, Bucks County, Pennsylvania, United States. It was built in 1740 and was owned by John Thompson, a local American Revolutionary War veteran. Despite also being known as the Hip Roof House, the house has an elongated-gambrel roof instead of a hip roof.

It was listed on the National Register of Historic Places on July 16, 1973.

John Thompson, born 16 Nov 1726 in County Tyrone, Ireland, immigrated to the US in the mid-1700s with his mother and three brothers. He served as an Ensign during the American Revolution in the Northampton Company of Associators. Son of Elizabeth (McGraudy) Thompson and brother of Robert Thompson who owned the now Historic Thompson-Neeley House in Washington's Crossing.

John, a miller like his brother Robert, married Mary Houston (the twin sister of his brother William's wife) on 17 Feb 1762. They had nine known children: Elizabeth, Hugh, Jane, John, Robert, John, William, Thomas & James. He was commissioned Sheriff of Bucks county, March 22, 1777(3) and served until October 17, 1779, being the first Sheriff of Bucks county commissioned under the constitution of 1776. He was appointed wagon master January 9, 1778 ; sub-agent for purchasing flour for the French fleet, on July 13, 1779 ; and Collector of Excise on October 20, 1783. It's probable that his position as a commissioned officer, as well as the fact that he had funds in his hands collected for the use of that government, caused him to receive a visit from the "Tory Doans" during the Revolutionary War. Their animosity was generally directed towards tax collectors.

At his death on 18 July 1799, he was one of the largest land owners in Bucks County with over 900 acres. According to his Will, his land was divided between his six sons. He was buried in the Presbyterian Graveyard, Newtown, Bucks County, PA.

See also 
 National Register of Historic Places listings in Bucks County, Pennsylvania

References

Houses completed in 1740
Houses on the National Register of Historic Places in Pennsylvania
Houses in Bucks County, Pennsylvania
National Register of Historic Places in Bucks County, Pennsylvania